Tayata may refer to:

Santa Cruz Tayata
Santa Catarina Tayata